Earls Court 1975 were five concerts performed by the English rock band Led Zeppelin at Earls Court Arena in London in May 1975.

Overview
The concerts were initially booked for three nights on 23, 24 and 25 May, but due to unprecedented public demand (tickets for the three shows sold out within just four hours), two further dates were added for 17 and 18 May, making total ticket sales 85,000. Noted critic and film director Tony Palmer stated at the time in The Observer that no group in history had ever attracted such an audience in Britain.

These concerts took place less than two months following the conclusion of Led Zeppelin's 1975 North American tour. The whole of the band's 40-ton stage and light show was airlifted from the United States for the concerts. A huge Eidophor screen which showed the action as it was being filmed was also erected above the stage, at a cost of £10,000. This is thought to be one of the first occasions when such a device was used for a rock show in England. It was said that an entire city could be lit by the energy spent in a single concert. Three days of rehearsals took place in order to fix every possible detail or PA problem. The sound at the concerts was managed by Showco.

The Earls Court performances were promoted by Mel Bush. In an interview he gave several years after the event, Bush explained:

To help promote the concerts, Bush and Grant used advertisements which displayed a train, dubbed the "Zeppelin Express", linked to Earl's Court via the InterCity train services of British Rail. It was intended to convey the message that, despite all the concerts being performed in one location, they would be easily accessible to fans from all parts of the country. This image was featured on the concert's official poster (see above, right), the originals of which are now among the most collectible posters in rock history. The posters were produced, together with the design for the concert programme, by Martine Grainey of Peter Grainey Graphics of Bournemouth.

Five promotional DJs were given the task of introducing the band on stage at each show. These were Bob Harris (17 May), Johnnie Walker (18 May), Kid Jensen (23 May), Nicky Horne (24 May) and Alan Freeman (25 May).

All of the shows exceeded three hours in length, with the final 25 May concert clocking in at three hours, 43 minutes and 50 seconds. Footage from the concerts remained unavailable for public viewing for years, until parts of it were eventually released in 2003 for the Led Zeppelin DVD.

Critical reaction
The Earls Court concerts are considered by some critics to be the best ever performed by the band, and the shows received generally excellent reviews from the music press, including those published in Sounds, New Musical Express and Melody Maker. Music journalist Chris Welch, who attended the performances, recalled years later:

According to Led Zeppelin archivist Dave Lewis:

Set list
For these concerts, the band revived an acoustic section that had been a component of many of their concert tours until late 1972, when it had been discarded from their set.

The set list for these five concerts was:

"Rock and Roll" (Page, Plant, Jones, Bonham)
"Sick Again" (Page, Plant)
"Over the Hills and Far Away" (Page, Plant)
"In My Time of Dying" (Page, Plant, Jones, Bonham)
"The Song Remains the Same" (Page, Plant)
"The Rain Song" (Page, Plant)
"Kashmir" (Bonham, Page, Plant)
"No Quarter" (Page, Plant, Jones)
"Tangerine" (Page)
"Going to California" (Page, Plant)
"That's the Way" (Page, Plant)
"Bron-Yr-Aur Stomp" (Page, Plant, Jones)
"Trampled Under Foot" (Page, Plant, Jones) (incl. "Gallows Pole")
"Moby Dick" (Bonham, Jones, Page)
"Dazed and Confused" (Page) (incl. "Woodstock"/"San Francisco (Be Sure to Wear Flowers in Your Hair)")
"Stairway to Heaven" (Page, Plant)

Encores:
"Whole Lotta Love" (Bonham, Dixon, Jones, Page, Plant) (incl. "The Crunge")
"Black Dog" (Page, Plant, Jones)
Additional encores on the last show, on 25 May:
"Heartbreaker" (Bonham, Page, Plant)
"Communication Breakdown" (Bonham, Jones, Page) (incl. "D'yer Mak'er")

Tour dates

Cancelled North American tour dates
A North American tour consisting of 33 dates was planned for August–September 1975, but due to Robert Plant's serious car accident, it was cancelled. Some of the dates the tour would have consisted of include:

There were also plans for a trip to South America afterwards, followed by a UK tour in winter 1976 and Europe in spring; however, these plans were shelved.

The band did play a 45-minute impromptu show on 16 December 1975 in Jersey. The band would not perform live again until their next tour in 1977.

Sources
Lewis, Dave and Pallett, Simon (1997) Led Zeppelin: The Concert File, London: Omnibus Press. .

References

External links
Comprehensive archive of known concert appearances by Led Zeppelin (official website)
Led Zeppelin concert setlists
Review of the concert in The Times, 26 May 1975
Led Zeppelin Earls Court Programme, 1975
View in Google Earth

Led Zeppelin concert tours
1975 concert tours
1975 in London
Earls Court